Kathrine Narducci (born November 22, 1965) is an American actress, known for her role as Charmaine Bucco, Artie Bucco's wife, on the HBO crime drama series The Sopranos (1999–2007). Her film credits include A Bronx Tale (1993), Chicago Overcoat (2009), Jersey Boys (2014), Bad Education (2019), The Irishman (2019), and Capone (2020).

Early life
Narducci was born to an Italian-American family in Italian Harlem, New York City. Her father, Nicky Narducci, was a bar owner and local figure in the Mafia in East Harlem, and was killed in a mob-related hit in front of his bar when Kathrine was ten years old.

Career
Narducci's acting career began in 1993 when she brought her 9-year-old son to an open casting call for the role of a 9-year-old boy in A Bronx Tale. While auditioning her son, Narducci successfully auditioned for the role of the film protagonist's mother. In following years, she made multiple guest appearances in television shows, including Law & Order, Law & Order: Special Victims Unit, NYPD Blue, Third Watch, and Blue Bloods. In 1999, she was cast as Charmaine Bucco, Artie Bucco's wife, on the HBO crime drama series The Sopranos, a role she played until series finale in 2007.

In 2009, she starred in the gangster film Chicago Overcoat. In 2014, she played a supporting role in Clint Eastwood's Jersey Boys. Also that year, she was regular cast member in the Starz crime series Power. The following years, she had supporting roles in films The Wizard of Lies (2017), Bad Education (2019), The Irishman (2019), and Capone (2020). In 2019, she had a recurring role in the Epix series Godfather of Harlem.

Filmography

Film

Television

References

External links

Charmaine Bucco on HBO.com

American television actresses
American film actresses
Actresses from New York City
American people of Italian descent
1965 births
Living people
People from East Harlem
21st-century American actresses
20th-century American actresses